Salema is a village located near Vila do Bispo in the Algarve, Portugal. Historically it was a fishing village, but it is now a popular tourist destination.

Gallery

References

External links 

 Salema, Algarve, Portugal Tourist Information website
 Salema village website

Villages in the Algarve
Beaches of the Algarve